Lippia graveolens, a species of flowering plant in the verbena or vervain family, Verbenaceae, is native to the southwestern United States (Texas and southern New Mexico), Mexico, and Central America as far south as Nicaragua. Common names include: Mexican oregano, redbrush lippia,  ('wild oregano'), scented lippia, and scented matgrass. It is a shrub or small tree, reaching   in height. Fragrant white or yellowish flowers can be found on the plant throughout the year, especially after rains.

Uses
The essential oil of Lippia graveolens contains 0-81% thymol, 0-48% carvacrol, 3-30% para-cymene, and 0-15% eucalyptol. The first two components give the plant a flavor similar to oregano (to which it is not closely related), and the leaves are widely used as an herb in Mexico and Central America.

See also
 Hedeoma patens, Spanish common name  ('small oregano'); native to the Mexican states of Chihuahua and Coahuila.
 Coleus amboinicus, known as Cuban oregano,  ('pennyroyal oregano'),  ('French oregano'), Mexican mint, Mexican thyme, and many other names. Common throughout the tropics, including Latin America, but probably of eastern-hemisphere origin.

References

graveolens
Plants described in 1818
Herbs
Mexican cuisine
Flora of Costa Rica
Flora of Guatemala
Flora of Honduras
Flora of Mexico
Flora of New Mexico
Flora of Nicaragua
Flora of Texas
Crops originating from Mexico